Yaroslav is a Slavic given name. Its variant spelling is Jaroslav and Iaroslav, and its feminine form is Yaroslava. The surname derived from the name is Yaroslavsky and its variants. All may refer to:

Historical figures
 Yaroslav I the Wise (978–1054), Grand Prince of Kiev, later King Jaroslav I of Kiev, and son of Vladimir the Great, founder of Yaroslav the city
 Yaroslav II of Kiev (died 1180), son of Iziaslav II of Kiev
 Yaroslav II of Vladimir (1191–1246), Grand Prince and son of Vsevolod the Big Nest and Maria Shvarnovna
 Yaroslav of Tver (1220–1271), sometimes called Yaroslav III, Grand Prince and son of Yaroslav II of Vladimir

Contemporary people with the given name

Yaroslav
 Yaroslav Amosov (born 1993), Ukrainian mixed martial arts fighter
 Yaroslav Askarov (born 2002), Russian ice hockey player
 Yaroslav Blanter (born 1967), Russian physicist
 Yaroslav Levchenko (born 1987), Russian artist based in Greece
 Yaroslav Paniot (born 1997), Ukrainian figure skater
 Yaroslav Rakitskiy (born 1989), Ukrainian footballer
 Yaroslav Senyshyn, also known as Slava, Canadian pianist, author, professor of philosophy of music aesthetics, philosophy, and moral education
 Yaroslav Stetsko (1912–1986), leader of the Stepan Banderas Organization of Ukrainian Nationalists (OUN)

Yaroslava
Yaroslava Bondarenko (born 1997), Russian cyclist
Yaroslava Frolova (born 1997), Russian handball player 
Yaroslava Mahuchikh (born 2001), Ukrainian high jumper.
Yaroslava Nechaeva, ice dancer who competed for the Soviet Union, Russia, and Latvia
Yaroslava Pavlovich (born 1969), Belarusian rowing player
Yaroslava Plaviuk (1926–2023), Ukrainian women's movement leader and activist
Yaroslava Shvedova (born 1987), Russian-born Kazakhstan tennis player
Yaroslava Yakushina (born 1993), Russian middleweight boxer

Jaroslav

 Jaroslav Drobný, Czech tennis player
 Jaroslav Foglar, Czech novelist
 Jaroslav Halák, Slovak ice hockey player
 Jaroslav Hašek, Czech author
 Jaroslav Heyrovský, Czech chemist and inventor, recipient of the Nobel prize
 Jaroslav Janiš, Czech race car driver
 Jaroslav Janus, Slovak ice hockey player
 Jaroslav Jakubovič, Czech jazz saxophonist
 Jaroslav Levinský, Czech tennis player
 Jaroslav Modrý, former Czech ice hockey player
 Jaroslav Nešetřil, Czech mathematician
 Jaroslav Pelikan, American Christian scholar
 Jaroslav Pospíšil, Czech tennis player
 Jaroslav Seifert, Czech poet, recipient of the Nobel prize
 Jaroslav Špaček, Czech Ice Hockey player

Jarosław 
Jarosław, Duke of Opole (c. 1143–1201), Duke Opole from 1173 and Bishop of Wrocław from 1198 until his death
Jarosław z Bogorii i Skotnik (c. 1276–1376), Polish nobleman and bishop, member of the Bogoriowie family of the Bogorya
Jarosław Dąbrowski (1836–1871), Polish nobleman, military officer, and political activist
Jarosław Hampel (born 1982), Polish Speedway rider
Jarosław Iwaszkiewicz (1894–1980), Polish writer, poet, essayist, dramatist and translator
Jarosław Kaczyński (born 1949), Polish politician, Prime Minister (2006-2007)
Jarosław Kukowski (born 1972), Polish contemporary painter
Jarosław Kukulski (1944–2010) Polish composer
Jarosław Wałęsa (born 1976), Polish politician and son of former Polish President Lech Wałęsa

Jarosława
Jarosława Jóźwiakowska (born 1937), Polish athlete who mainly competed in the high jump

Contemporary people with the surname
Yemelyan Yaroslavsky (Minei Gubelman), Soviet politician
Zev Yaroslavsky (born 1948), U.S. politician
Oleksandr Yaroslavsky (born 1959), Ukrainian businessman

See also
 Yaroslavl (inhabited locality)
 Jaroslav (disambiguation)
 Jarosław (disambiguation)
 Yaroslavsky (disambiguation)

Russian masculine given names
Ukrainian masculine given names